A colonial exhibition was a type of international exhibition that was held to boost trade. During the 1880s and beyond, colonial exhibitions had the additional aim of bolstering popular support for the various colonial empires during the New Imperialism period, which included the scramble for Africa.

The first colonial exhibition, in Victoria, Australia, in 1866, was the progeny of 25 years of similar exhibitions, also held in Melbourne, in which other colonies within the Australian continent participated.

Perhaps the most notable colonial exhibition was the 1931 Paris Colonial Exposition, which lasted six months and sold 33 million tickets. Paris's Colonial Exhibition opened on 6 May 1931 on 110 hectares (272 acres) of the Bois de Vincennes. The exhibition included dozens of temporary museums and façades representing the various colonies of the European nations, as well as several permanent buildings. Among these were the Palais de la Porte Dorée, designed by architect Albert Laprode, which then housed the Musée permanent des Colonies, and serves today as the Cité nationale de l'histoire de l'immigration.

The French Communist Party held an anti-colonial counter-exhibition near the 1931 Colonial Exhibition, titled The truth about the colonies. The first section was dedicated to crimes during the colonial conquests, and quoted Albert Londres and André Gide's criticisms of forced labour. The second one contrasted the Soviet Union's "nationalities policy" with "imperialist colonialism".

Germany and Portugal also staged colonial exhibitions. Human zoos were featured in some of the exhibitions, such as in the Parisian 1931 exhibition.

The Empire of Japan hosted colonial showcases in exhibitions within the Home Islands, but also held several full-scale expositions inside its colonies of Korea and Taiwan. These exhibitions did however have objectives comparable to that of their European counterparts, in that they highlighted economic achievements and social progress under Japanese colonial rule to Japanese and colonial subjects alike. 

Brussels was the venue for the last colonial exhibition: the Belgian Foire coloniale, held in 1948.

Colonial exhibitions
Exhibitions that may be described as colonial exhibitions include the following.

Notes

References

Bibliography 
 Alexander C.T. Geppert, Fleeting Cities. Imperial Expositions in Fin-de-Siècle Europe, Basingstoke/New York: Palgrave Macmillan, 2010.

See also 
Colonialism
Human zoo
List of world's fairs
Impact of Western European colonialism and colonisation

External links
Exposition Coloniale of Paris 1931 photographs
  

 
History of colonialism
World's fairs